is a Japanese manga series written and illustrated by Nene Yukimori. It was serialized in Shueisha's seinen manga magazine Weekly Young Jump from October 2019 to March 2023, with its chapters collected in eleven tankōbon volumes as of December 2022. An anime television series adaptation by Pine Jam premiered in January 2023.

Premise
High school student Junta Shiraishi is so ordinary and quiet that his classmates and teachers do not notice him at all, as if he were a mob character in a video game, that is, until his female classmate Kubo pays attention to him and dares him to do things that would make him stand out.

Characters

Junta's classmate and the only one who gives him attention. She is fond of teasing him.

Nagisa's older sister who works at a bookstore.

Media

Manga
Written and illustrated by Nene Yukimori, Kubo Won't Let Me Be Invisible was serialized in Shueisha's seinen manga magazine Weekly Young Jump from October 24, 2019, to March 2, 2023. Shueisha has collected its chapters into individual tankōbon volumes. The first volume was released on February 19, 2020. As of December 19, 2022, eleven volumes have been released. The 12th and final volume will include an extra epilogue chapter set after the main story.

The series is simultaneously published in English and Spanish on Shueisha's Manga Plus service and Viz Media's Shonen Jump website. Viz Media licensed the series for print publication in North America.

Volume list

Anime
An anime television series adaptation was announced on May 13, 2022. It is produced by Pine Jam and directed by Kazuomi Koga, with scripts written by Yūya Takahashi, character designs handled by Yoshiko Saitō, and music composed by Kujira Yumemi. The series premiered on January 10, 2023, on AT-X and other networks. At Anime NYC 2022, Sentai Filmworks announced that they licensed the series, and will be streaming it on Hidive. Medialink licensed the series in Asia-Pacific. 

After the broadcast of Episode 3, the anime's website announced that the series past Episode 6 would be delayed due to the COVID-19 pandemic and will be rebroadcast in April, effectively restarting from Episode 1.

Episode list

Reception
In 2020, Kubo Won't Let Me Be Invisible was nominated in the sixth Next Manga Awards and placed 19th out of 50 nominees with 9,306 votes. In 2021, the series was again nominated in the seventh Next Manga Awards and placed 7th of 50 nominees.

Explanatory notes

References

External links
 

 

2019 manga
2023 anime television series debuts
Anime postponed due to the COVID-19 pandemic
Anime series based on manga
AT-X (TV network) original programming
Medialink
Pine Jam
Romantic comedy anime and manga
School life in anime and manga
Seinen manga
Sentai Filmworks
Shueisha manga
Viz Media manga